Caloosahatchee may refer to:

Caloosahatchee River, a river on the southwest Gulf Coast of Florida in the United States
Caloosahatchee culture, an archaeological culture on the Gulf coast of Southwest Florida that lasted from about 500 to 1750 CE
Caloosahatchee National Wildlife Refuge, part of the United States National Wildlife Refuge System
USS Caloosahatchee (AO-98), US Navy ship